Stephen Chase may refer to:

Stephen Chase (American football) (1874–1968), college football coach
Stephen Chase (politician), American politician from Maine

See also
Steve Chase, American social justice activist
Stephan Chase (1945–2019), British actor
Steve Case (born 1958),  American businessman